Princess Hejia of the Second Rank (和碩和嘉公主; 24 December 1745 – 29 October 1767), was a Chinese princess of the Qing dynasty.She was the fourth daughter of Qianlong Emperor born by his concubine, Imperial Noble Consort Chunhui.

Life 
Princess Hejia of the Second Rank was born on 24 December 1745 at Jingren Palace in the Forbidden City to Noble Consort Chun (純貴妃).

On 10 March 1760, Princess Hejia married Fulong'an (福隆安), Fuheng Second son. In the 28th year of Qianlong (1763), on 23 August, Princess Hejia gave birth to her first child, a son, named Fengshenjilun (丰神吉伦). It is unknown when she gave birth to her second son, Fengshenguolemin (丰神果勒敏).

When she died on 29 October 1767 at the age of twenty-one, the Qianlong Emperor was devastated.

Ancestry

References 

1745 births
1767 deaths
Qing dynasty princesses
18th-century Chinese women
18th-century Chinese people
Daughters of emperors
People from Beijing